Naderabad was a city created in 1738 by Nader Shah, the King of Persia from 1736 to 1747. Nader built the city in the aftermath of his army's destruction of Old Kandahar and named the city after himself. When Nader Shah died in 1747 the city was abandoned, though it continued to appear on 19th century European maps.

See also
Kandahar
Old Kandahar

References

Destroyed cities
Former populated places in Afghanistan
1738 establishments in Asia
Ruins in Afghanistan
Afsharid Iran